The City of Houston includes a significant population of Central American origin due to Texas’ proximity to Central America, including origins from El Salvador, Guatemala, Honduras, and other countries.

History

Beginning in the late 1970s Central American countries began experiencing economic and political instability. In 1980 there were 5,400 Central American immigrants in Greater Houston. In the 1980s, Due to social political problems, a wave of immigration from Central America occurred, with people from El Salvador, Guatemala, Honduras, and Nicaragua arriving. In 1990, there were 47,244 Central Americans in Harris County, with 83% of them being immigrants. The number of Salvadorans among the immigrants was almost 250% that of the combined number of non-Salvadorans.

This immigration wave from Central America lead to many Central Americans settling portions of Southwest Houston and west Houston. They settled southwest and west Houston because of a large amount of low income housing that was left vacant by Anglos during the 1980s oil bust. The existing Mexican neighborhoods in such as those in the Second Ward and Magnolia Park largely did not attract Central American immigrants because the neighborhoods did not have enough housing capacity to attract the new immigrants. Rodriguez wrote that a "large segment" of illegal immigrants did settle the longtime Hispanic barrios. This immigration wave from Central America lead to Central Americans settling portions of Southwest Houston and west Houston. The immigration wave caused portions of previously almost entirely Anglo portions of Houston to gain new areas of Hispanic settlers. Rodriguez wrote that of the illegal immigrants, "perhaps one-third to one-half," by 1986, lived in "neighborhoods that form zones of Hispanic transition or zones of new Hispanic settlement."

Central Americans who illegally immigrated after 1982 were not eligible for the federal government's amnesty program for illegal immigrants. Some Central Americans became eligible for amnesty and legalization at a later date. Most Central Americans, after arriving, worked in the service sector in informal, low-paying jobs. At the time many immigrated, Houston was experiencing an economic recession.

Central American immigrants received almost no support from the US government. Catholic nuns and priests took efforts to find shelter and food for Central American refugees. Due to the political nature of the immigration, many of the immigrants became involved in political activism upon arriving in the US and they protested US government political interventions in Central America. Around the time of the immigration wave of the 1980s, the Federal Bureau of Investigation (FBI) investigated several Houston residents who had immigrated from Latin America and who had supported leftist groups in their home countries. The FBI investigated left-wing groups opposing the Reagan Administration policies in Latin America, including Committee in Solidarity with the People of El Salvador (CISPES). In addition, the Immigration and Naturalization Service (INS) had arrested illegal immigrants from Central America who had been living in Houston. Nestor Rodriguez, author of "Undocumented Central Americans in Houston: Diverse Populations," wrote that the 1985 surveillance and interrogation of illegal immigrant Salvadorans by agents of the federal government of the United States and the prosecution of sanctuary movement workers by the U.S. government, "demonstrate that the U.S. government perceived these migrants with a special political concern."

In 1990, there were 39,289 immigrants from Central America in Houston. By the 1990s immigration from Central America decreased because the political situations stabilized in Central American countries and Houston's improving economy gave Central Americans economic mobility on par with Mexicans. At that time Southwest Houston developed infrastructure that catered to Central Americans.

By 2003 there were about 115,000 Central Americans in Houston.

Demographics

By 1986 the most prominent groups of Central Americans came from El Salvador, Guatemala, and Honduras. Rodriguez identified five key groups: Salvadorans from urban and rural areas, urban Hispanic Guatemalans, rural Guatemalans of Mayan/indigenous origin, urban Hispanic Hondurans, and rural Hondurans of Garifuna origin.

As of 1986 the largest group of Central American immigrants originated from El Salvador. Since 1970 the Houston area had received Salvadoran immigrants, and the number of illegal immigrants from El Salvador in 1986 was, according to Rodriguez, "probably" over 50,000. Rodriguez stated that the number of Guatemalans was "substantially smaller" and was "probably fewer than half of the Salvadoran population, perhaps 10,000 to 15,000" in 1986. Rodriguez stated that according to interviews Guatemalans began arriving around 1982–1983. According to Rodriguez, in 1986 there were about 5,000 to 10,000 Hondurans and that they began arriving in the mid-1980s.

Nestor Rodriguez, author of "Hispanic and Asian Immigration Waves in Houston," wrote that Central American immigrants' "[n]ational identities became the basis for their residential, workplace, and recreational groupings in Central American settlement areas." For instance Guatemalan Mayans settled in distinct areas separated by their regional backgrounds and native languages, separate from other Guatemalan immigrants. Garifuna-speaking Black Caribs (Garifuna Americans) from Belize and Honduras settled in different areas depending on whether they identified more with their black race or their Hispanic ethnicity. If they identified with the race more they settled with African-Americans. If they identified more with the Hispanic ethnicity they settled with Central Americans. In 1990 the median household income of Central Americans was $17,429 and 6% of those aged 25 or older had a bachelor's degree.

Nestor Rodriguez differentiated between Guatemalans of Hispanic origins and Guatemalans of Mayan origin: the latter only stated "Hispanic" on official forms for employment, medical, and other purposes as they perceive the term "Hispanic" as a residual category. Rodriguez stated that in Houston the indigenous Mayans preferred to not be addressed as indios ("Indians") believing it was an "incorrect, improper, and denigrating term" so he referred to them as indigenas ("indigenous"). This was despite the prevalence of English-language literature referring to them as "Indians".

The ethnic composition of Central Americans is quite diverse, Salvadorans and Costa Ricans tend to identify themselves more as White, Guatemalans tend more to identify themselves as Native Americans, two or more races or some other race (Mestizo, Ladino and Mulato), Hondurans, Panamanians and Nicaraguans tend to identify more as Black Latin Americans, two or more races and some other race.

Language
By the 1980s, due to the influx of Central Americans, new languages such as Guatemalan Mayan languages and Garifuna, a language spoken in Honduras, began having a presence in Houston. As of 1986, the Salvadorans, urban Hispanic Guatemalans, and urban Hispanic Hondurans spoke Spanish. The indigena Guatemalans were bilingual in Spanish and languages such as Kaqchikel (Cakchikel), Kiche' (Quiche), and Mam. The Garifunas from Honduras were bilingual in Spanish and Garifuna.

Jessi Elana Aaron and José Esteban Hernández, authors of "Quantitative evidence for contact-induced accommodation: Shifts in /s/ reduction patterns in Salvadoran Spanish in Houston," wrote that "Contact and interaction between Salvadorans and Mexicans in Houston is intense" despite the fact that "the awareness of distinct phonological and morphosyntactic features in Houston seems to translate into negative attitudes" against Salvadoran speech and Salvadoran people and that in many of the interviews the authors conducted the negative attitudes towards the Salvadoran speech were "clearly reflected". Aaron and Hernández stated that in Houston, with contact between Mexican Spanish and Salvadoran Spanish there is a "one-sided" "pressure" on the Salvadoran speech but not on the Mexican Spanish.

Culture

Due to the influx of Central American immigrants, by the 1980s foods such as pupusas from El Salvador and Guatemalan tamales de maiz began having a presence in Houston.

In 2002, the first Pollo Campero opened in Houston, in the Gulfton neighborhood. On the opening day, news channels reported on Latin Americans, including Guatemalans and Salvadorans, waiting up to five hours in line to get their food from Pollo Campero.

Institutions

The Consulate-General of El Salvador in Houston resides in the Spring Branch area of Houston. Other Central American consulates include those of Costa Rica, Guatemala, Honduras, Nicaragua, and Panama.

 many Central American businesses have outlets in Gulfton. As of that year, ADOC footwear has its only United States store located in Gulfton. As of that year Salvadoran banks have three branches and an importing business in the area.

In 1985, recent Salvadoran immigrants opened the Central American Refugee Center (CARECEN) to provide legal services for Central American immigrants. Between 1988 and 1992 CARECEN cooperated with the Central American Refugee Committee (CARC) to publicize and advocate issues related to the Salvadoran Civil War and the immigration of Salvadorans to the United States. In 1992 the Salvadoran Civil War ended but CARECEN continued to provide legal services, publications, and advocacy for Central American immigrants. They also began campaigning the federal government to provide permanent legal residency to the Salvadoran refugees.

In media
The 2012 novel The Knife and the Butterfly by Ashley Hope Pérez, based on the 2006 death of Gabriel Granillo, has a Salvadoran American main character. Pérez researched MS-13 and Houston's Salvadoran community. One aspect in the novel is the differing use of Spanish. The younger Salvadoran Americans have influence from other Spanish dialects while the older ones have signature elements of Salvadoran Spanish such as the use of "vos".

Notable Central Americans from Houston

See also

 Demographics of Houston
 History of the Mexican-Americans in Houston
 Gulfton, Houston

References
Aaron, Jessi Elana (University of Florida) and José Esteban Hernández (University of Texas, Pan-American). "Quantitative evidence for contact-induced accommodation: Shifts in /s/ reduction patterns in Salvadoran Spanish in Houston." In: Potowski, Kim and Richard Cameron (editors). Spanish in Contact: Policy, Social and Linguistic Inquiries (Volume 22 of Impact, studies in language and society, ISSN 1385-7908). John Benjamins Publishing, 2007. Start page 329. .
Gelbspan, Ross. Break-ins, Death Threats and the FBI: The Covert War Against the Central America Movement (Latina/O and Latin American Studies). South End Press, 1991. .

 Also available in: Ebaugh, Helen Rose Fuchs and Janet Saltzman Chafetz (editors). Religion and the New Immigrants: Continuities and Adaptations in Immigrant Congregations. Rowman & Littlefield, January 1, 2000. .
Rodriguez, Nestor P. (University of Houston) "Undocumented Central Americans in Houston: Diverse Populations." International Migration Review Vol. 21, No. 1 (Spring, 1987), pp. 4–26. Available at JStor.
Taafe, Lisa (LMSW) and Robert Fisher (PhD). "Public Life in Gulfton: Multiple Publics and Models of Organization." in: Weil, Marie (editor). Community Practice: Models in Action. Psychology Press, January 1, 1997. . - Available on Google Books
Also available from: Journal of Community Practice. Volume 4, Issue 1, 1997. DOI: 10.1300/J125v04n01_03. p. 31-56. Published online on October 16, 2008.

Notes

Further reading

Althaus, Dudley. "Central Americans trying to get to Houston and beyond." Houston Chronicle. July 20, 2012.
  - Opinion section essay

Belizean-American culture
Costa Rican-American culture
Ethnic groups in Houston
Guatemalan-American culture
History of Houston
Hispanic and Latino American history
Hispanic and Latino American culture in Houston
Honduran-American culture
Nicaraguan-American culture
Panamanian-American culture
Salvadoran-American culture
Garifuna communities